Estrild Raymona Myers (March 11, 1909 – December 14, 1972), known professionally as Ramona,  was an American cabaret and jazz singer and pianist during the 1930s.

Biography
Growing up
Her parents' marriage was annulled before her birth by her paternal grandparents, Herman Jackson Myers (1859–1945) and Jessie Henrietta Pendery (1960–n.a.), though they were unaware that Rachel was pregnant. Rachel and Ramona, when she was still an infant, moved to Ashland, Kentucky, where Rachel met Charles Clifford Payne (1893–1933) and, around 1917, married him. The namesakes for Raymona Estrild were drawn from her father and her maternal grandmother, Estrild "Trillie" DeCamp (né Estrild Riggs; born 1860–1928).

Music career
When she was twelve, Ramona played piano at a hotel every weekend. She was hired by a radio station in Kansas City as a staff pianist.  Three years later moved to Pittsburgh and started singing. Around 1929, she became singer and pianist with Don Bestor and His Orchestra – at the William Penn Hotel in Pittsburgh and on tour, coast-to-coast.  She later performed in vaudeville.

Ramona became a vocalist and pianist for Paul Whiteman's Orchestra from 1932–37, succeeding Mildred Bailey. She performed on Whiteman's radio show in 1933, Al Jolson's radio show in 1933–34, and the Kraft Music Hall in late 1934 through early 1935 (before Bing Crosby took over the latter program in 1936). She was featured with the Whiteman band in the 20th Century-Fox 1935 film Thanks a Million. She left Whiteman's band in 1937 and worked as a solo act, recording for Liberty Music Shop Records. In the late 1930s, she led a male big band and recorded for Varsity Records.

Personal life
Ramona was married three times. She first married in 1929 to Howard L. Davies.  She then married 1936 to H. Kenyon Hopkins (1912–1983), an arranger for Andre Kostelanetz and Paul Whiteman. They divorced around June 1943. Ramona then married June 14, 1944, to baseball broadcaster Al Helfer, which whom, she had her only child, a daughter, Ramona Margaret Perry (née Ramona Margaret Helfer; 1945–2017), born in Manhattan, New York. Ramona, the mother, remained married to Al Helfer until her death.

Death
Ramona Davies died of cancer in Sacramento, California on December 14, 1972.

Discography
 Ramona and Her Grand Piano

Songs
 I Can't Give You Anything But Love, Baby (Jimmy McHugh & Dorothy Fields), recorded September 13, 1935
 I Hate to Think That You'll Grow Old, Baby (Lew Brown & Ray Henderson), March 7, 1933
 The Beat O' My Heart (Harold Spina & Johnny Burke), February 27, 1934
 You Excite Me! (Mitchell Parish & Frank Perkins), August 16, 1933
 Annie Doesn't Live Here Anymore (Harold Spina & Johnny Burke), October 24, 1933
 Broadway's Gone Hill-Billy, Lew Brown & Jay Gorney), March 27, 1934
 Are You Makin' Any Money? (Herman Hupfeld, July 20, 1933
 I Lay Me Down to Sleep, (Allie Wrubel), April 19, 1933
 Not for All the Rice in China (Irving Berlin), October 20, 1933
 A Penny for Your Thoughts (E.Y Harburg & Vernon Duke), March 1, 1933
 Barrel-House Music (Willard Robison) September 13, 1935
 Come Up and See Me Sometime (Louis Alter & Arthur Swanstrom). August 8, 1933
 I'm No Angel (Harvey Brooks, Gladys DuBois, Ben Ellison), October 20, 1933
 I Found a New Way to Go to Town (Harvey Brooks, Gladys DuBois, Ben Ellison), October 20, 1933
 New O'leans (Arthur Lange), July 9, 1935
 Ah, the Moon Is Here (Sammy Fain & Irving Kahal), August 16, 1933
 Tony's Wife (Burton Lane & Harold Adamson), March 7, 1933
 No Strings, (Irving Berlin), September 13, 1935
 Every Now And Then (Abner Silver, Al Sherman, & Al Lewis), September 13, 1935
 We're Out of the Red (Lew Brown & Jay Gorney), March 27, 1934
 Never Had an Education (Irving Caesar & Sigmund Romberg), March 7, 1933
 Raisin' the Rent (Harold Arlen & Ted Koehler), April 20, 1933
 Anything Goes, (Cole Porter), October 26, 1934
 The Heart Is Quicker Than the Eye (Lorenz Hart, Richard Rodgers), April 28, 1936

References

External Links
 
 

1909 births
1972 deaths
American cabaret performers
Deaths from cancer in California
People from Ashland, Kentucky
People from Lockland, Ohio
Musicians from Cincinnati
20th-century American singers
20th-century American women singers
Kentucky women musicians
RCA Victor artists